Bellenden is a surname, Scottish in origins and an older form of Ballantine/Ballantyne.

It may refer to:
John Bellenden, Scottish writer
John Bellenden (Lord Justice Clerk)
Katherine Bellenden, Scottish courtier
William Bellenden, Scottish classical scholar
Lewis Bellenden, (d. 1591) Scottish lawyer

Bellenden Road is also the name of a district of Peckham in London.

See also
Balanchine
Ballentine (disambiguation)
Ballantyne
Ballantine (surname)
Ballantine
Ballenden
Ballandean, Queensland
Balindean, the spelling used by the Ogilvy-Wedderburn baronets

References